Foggy Bay is an Arctic waterway in Kitikmeot Region, Nunavut, Canada. It is located in southwestern Queen Maud Gulf, off Nunavut's mainland.

Labyrinth Bay, Campbell Bay and Conolly Bay are nearby.

References

Bays of Kitikmeot Region